KVAB (102.9 FM) is a radio station broadcasting a classic rock format, licensed to Clarkston, Washington, United States. The station is owned by Pacific Empire Radio Corporation and features programming from Westwood One.

External links
KVAB 102.9 Facebook

VAB
Classic rock radio stations in the United States